Tahiti, which is a part of  French Polynesia, competed in the 2017 Asian Indoor and Martial Arts Games on the behalf of French Polynesia which was held in Ashgabat, Turkmenistan.

Tahiti sent a delegation consisting of 23 competitors for the multi-sport event. The competitors couldn't receive any medal in the competition.

Tahiti made its first appearance in the  Asian Indoor and Martial Arts Games for the first time (probably this was also the first instance where Tahiti as a separate nation competed in an international multi-sport event) along with other Oceania nations.

Participants

References 

Nations at the 2017 Asian Indoor and Martial Arts Games
Tahiti
2017 in French Polynesian sport